This is a list of United States Navy amphibious warfare ships. This type of ship has been in use with the US Navy since World War I. 

Ship status is indicated as either currently active [A] (including ready reserve), inactive [I], or precommissioning [P]. Ships in the inactive category include only ships in the inactive reserve, ships which have been disposed from US service have no listed status. Ships in the precommissioning category include ships under construction or on order.

Historical overview
There have been four generations of amphibious warfare ships, with each generation having more capability than the previous:
 The first generation simply landed troops and equipment ashore with standard (i.e., non-specialized) boats and barges. These ships are not listed in this article since they were indistinguishable from the troopships and other surface combatants of their day, and as such were not assigned specialized hull classification symbols.
 The second generation was designed during World War II to land personnel and vehicles ashore, either directly or via carried specialized landing craft.
 The third generation was designed beginning in the 1950's to use helicopters for amphibious operations, with the result that such operations were no longer limited to beaches.
 The fourth generation was designed beginning in the 1980's to use hovercraft (Landing Craft Air Cushion (LCAC) specifically), with the result that the numbers and types of beaches which could be accessed dramatically increased.

The first amphibious warfare ships had a top speed of 12 to 17 knots. All new ships with a full flight deck (LPH, LHA, LHD), the Landing Platform Docks (LPD) and the High Speed Transport destroyer conversions (APD/LPR) would meet this criteria. The other major types would see relatively small numbers of new ships constructed with this 20 knot requirement, with the last appearing in 1969.

Classifications
Amphibious warfare ships were considered by the US Navy to be auxiliaries and were classed with hull classification symbols beginning with 'A' until 1942. Many ships were reclassed at that time as landing ships and received new hull symbols beginning with 'L'; others would retain 'A' hull symbols until 1969 and then receive 'L' symbols. This article pairs the two lists of what are the same ships, with each 'L' list preceding the respective 'A' list. Littoral Combat Ships also use 'L' hull symbols but are not solely intended for amphibious warfare.

In 2015 the US Navy created new hull classification symbols that began with an 'E' to designate 'expeditionary' vessels. Expeditionary vessels are designed to support low-intensity missions, allowing more expensive, high-value amphibious warfare ships to be re-tasked for more demanding missions. Most of these ships are not commissioned warships, but rather are operated by the Military Sealift Command.

Amphibious Assault Ship (General Purpose) (LHA)

Tarawa-class

The Tarawa-class LHA was the first to combine the features of the well deck of the Landing Ship Dock (LSD) or Landing Platform Dock (LPD) and the full flight deck of the Landing Platform Helicopter (LPH) into one ship.

  [I]
 
 
 
 USS Peleliu (LHA-5) [I]

America-class

The America-class LHA would be a follow-on to the Wasp-class LHD. The first two ships, America and Tripoli, would not have a well deck, so as to dedicate more space to the support of air operations. This was criticized as a repeat of the mistakes of the LPH concept, and so it was decided that Bougainville and all future ships of this class would have a well deck.

  [A]
  [A]
  [P]
  [P]
 (LHA-10) [P]

Amphibious Assault Ship (Multi-Purpose) (LHD)

Wasp-class

The well deck of the Tarawa-class LHA was not designed to accommodate the Landing Craft Air Cushion (LCAC), which came into service just six years after the last of that class was completed. The Wasp-class LHD and the later units of the America-class LHA were designed to be LCAC compatible; the Wasp-class could carry 3 LCACs.

  [A]
  [A]
  [A]
  [A]
  [A]
 , scrapped after a 15 April 2021 pierside fire
  [A]
  [A]

Landing Platform Helicopter (LPH)

The Landing Platform Helicopter (LPH) would be the first ships to operate helicopters for large scale air assault behind beaches. One major defect of the LPH concept was that these ships did not carry landing craft to disembark Marines when weather or hostile anti-aircraft systems grounded helicopters; only Inchon would be modified to carry two landing craft. In such situations the LPH would be reliant on landing craft supplied by other ships, which proved awkward in practice. This defect would drive the design of the Tarawa-class LHA, in effect a LPH with a well deck.

Commencement Bay-class
 , ex-CVE-106, conversion canceled

Iwo Jima-class

As the 'definitive' LPH design, the Iwo Jima class would be the only class to be built as such, with sufficient 'hotel' accommodations for the embarked Marines. All other LPH ships would be conversions of aircraft carriers, and so had accommodation deficiencies (for example, some Marine units could not bunk together, and water distillation was insufficient to allow all personnel showers within a 24 hour period).

After their retirement as amphibious warfare ships, one (Inchon) would be converted to carry minesweeping helicopters as a mine countermeasures support ship (MCS). All of these ships would be scrapped or sunk as targets by 2018.

 
 
 
 
 
 
 , later MCS-12

Essex-class
The following LPH ships were converted Essex-class aircraft carriers, due to budget constraints with the construction of the Iwo Jima class ships.

 , ex-CV-21 
 , ex-CV-37
  ex-CV-45

Casablanca-class
Thetis Bay was converted from a Casablanca-class escort carrier. Under the hull designation CVHA-1, she was the prototype for the LPH concept.
 , ex-CVE-90, CVHA-1

Landing Platform Dock (LPD)

The Landing Platform Dock (LPD) concept began as a compromise design, an attempt to build a ship with much more capability than a Landing Ship Dock (LSD) - the LPD superficially resembles an LSD with an enlarged flight deck - but without the expense of a LPH. The well deck is smaller than that of an LSD.

Several of these ships were built with space dedicated for command capabilities. Two of these, LaSalle and Coronado, would be redesignated as auxiliary command ships (AGF).

Raleigh-class

 
 
 , later AGF-3

Austin-class

 
 
 
Cleveland-subclass
  [I]
  [I]
 
  [I]
 , later AGF-11
 
 
Trenton-subclass
 , later INS Jalashwa
 , later AFSB-15
 (LPD-16), not built

San Antonio-class

The San Antonio-class were the first LPDs designed to accommodate Landing Craft Air Cushion (LCAC); two could be carried.

  [A]
  [A]
  [A]
  [A]
  [A]
  [A]
  [A]
  [A]
  [A]
  [A]
  [A]
  [A]
  [P]
  [P]
  [P]
 (LPD-32) [P]
 (LPD-33) [P]

Landing Ship Dock (LSD)

The LSD came as a result of a British requirement during World War II for a vessel that could carry large landing craft across the seas at speed. The design was developed and built in the US for the Royal Navy and the US Navy. After the war they were modified with the addition of a temporary superdeck over the well deck; this could support helicopter operations, carry vehicles, or be removed for outsized cargo. 

In December 2020 the U.S. Navy's Report to Congress on the Annual Long-Range Plan for Construction of Naval Vessels stated that it was planned that all LSDs would be placed Out of Commission in Reserve by 2027.

Ashland-class

 
 
 
 , later MCS-7
 , later ARA Cándido de Lasala
 
 
 , later ROCS Chung Cheng until 1985

Casa Grande-class

 (LSD-9) To Britain as HMS Eastway
 (LSD-10) To Britain as HMS Highway
 (LSD-11) To Britain as HMS Northway
 (LSD-12) To Britain as HMS Oceanway
 
 
 
 
 
 
 , later ROCS Chung Cheng after 1985
 
 
 
 USS Fort Snelling (LSD-23), canceled, sold for commercial service, later reacquired and converted to 
 USS Point Defiance (LSD-24), canceled

Thomaston-class

The Thomaston class would be the first class of LSDs capable of 20 knots. 

 
 
 
 
 
 , later Brazilian Rio de Janeiro
 , later Brazilian Ceará

Anchorage-class

The Anchorage class was basically the Thomaston class with the well deck enlarged (49 feet longer and 2 feet wider) to accommodate the new larger LCU-1610 class. They would later be modified to carry up to 3 LCACs. 

 
 
 , later ROCS Hsu Hai

Whidbey Island-class

The Whidbey Island-class were the first LSDs designed to accommodate Landing Craft Air Cushion (LCAC) - up to 5 LCACs could be carried - and the first in which the helicopter deck would not be removable.

  [I]
  [A]
  [I]
  [A]
  [A]
  [A]
  [A]
  [A]

Harpers Ferry-class

The Harpers Ferry-class is basically the Whidbey Island-class with more cargo capacity at the expense of a shorter well deck which could carry 2 LCACs.

  [A]
  [A]
  [A]
  [A]

Mechanized Artillery Transports (APM)
The APM hull classification was short-lived; it was changed to Landing Ship Dock (LSD).

 USS Ashland (APM-1)
 USS Belle Grove (APM-2)
 USS Carter Hall (APM-3)
 USS Epping Forest (APM-4)
 USS Gunston Hall (APM-5)
 USS Lindenwald (APM-6)
 USS Oak Hill (APM-7)
 USS White Marsh (APM-8)
 USS Lakehurst (APM-9)

Amphibious Command Ship (LCC)

All Amphibious Force Flagships (AGC) in service in 1969 were reclassed as Amphibious Command Ships (LCC), which should not be confused with the World War II era Landing Craft, Control (LCC).

Mount McKinkey-class

 USS Mount McKinley (LCC-7)
 USS Eldorado (LCC-11)
 USS Estes (LCC-12)

Adirondack-class

 USS Pocono (LCC-16)
 USS Taconic (LCC-17)

Blue Ridge-class

The Blue Ridge-class would be the only amphibious command ships purposely built as such by the US Navy, and the first and only class capable of exceeding 20 knots. Their hulls were based on the Iwo Jima-class Landing Platform Helicopter (LPH) design due to the need for flat deck space for multiple antennas. After the retirement of the fleet flagships [cruisers] these ships would be pressed into that role despite their lack of speed relative to carrier strike groups.

  [A]
  [A]

Amphibious Force Flagship (AGC)

All Amphibious Force Flagships (AGC) in service in 1969 were reclassed as Amphibious Command Ships (LCC).

 USS Appalachian (AGC-1)
 
 USS Rocky Mount (AGC-3)
 USS Catoctin (AGC-5)

Troop transport conversion
 , ex-AP-66

Coast Guard cutter conversions
 USCGC Duane (WAGC-6), ex-WPG-33
, ex-WPG-37

 USS Mount McKinley (AGC-7), later LCC-7
 USS Mount Olympus (AGC-8)
 
 
 USS Eldorado (AGC-11), later LCC-11
 USS Estes (AGC-12), later LCC-12
 
 USS Teton (AGC-14)

 
 USS Pocono (AGC-16), later LCC-16
 USS Taconic (AGC-17), later LCC-17

Barnegat-class seaplane tender conversion
 USS Biscayne (AGC-18), ev-AVP-11

Presidential yacht (never used as a true AGC)
 USS Williamsburg (AGC-369), ex-PG-56

Amphibious Cargo Ship (LKA)

All Attack Cargo Ships (AKA) in service in 1969 were reclassed as Amphibious Cargo Ships (LKA).

Arcturus-class
 USS Libra (LKA-12)

Andromeda-class

 USS Thuban (LKA-19)
 USS Algol (LKA-54)
 USS Arneb (LKA-56)
 USS Capricornus (LKA-57)
 USS Muliphen (LKA-61)
 USS Yancey (LKA-93)
 USS Winston (LKA-94)
 USS Merrick (LKA-97)

Tolland-class attack cargo ship

 USS Rankin (LKA-103)
 USS Seminole (LKA-104)
 USS Skagit (LKA-105)
 USS Union (LKA-106)
 USS Vermilion (LKA-107)
 USS Washburn (LKA-108)

Tulare-class
The Tulare would be the first AKA/LKA capable of 20 knots. 
 USS Tulare (LKA-112)

Charleston-class

Attack Cargo Ship (AKA)

All Attack Cargo Ships (AKA) in service in 1969 were reclassed as Amphibious Cargo Ships (LKA).

 , ex-AK-18
 , ex-AK-19
 , ex-AK-20
 , ex-AK-21
 , ex-AK-22, later AE-20
 , ex-AK-23
 , ex-AK-24
 , ex-AK-25
 , ex-AK-26
 , ex-AK-27
 , ex-AK-28
 , ex-AK-53, later LKA-12
 , ex-AK-55
 , ex-AK-56
 , ex-AK-64
 , ex-AK-65
 , ex-AK-66
 , ex-AK-67
 , ex-AK-68, later LKA-19
 , ex-AK-69, later AE-30
 
 
 
 
 
 
 
 
 
 
 
 
 
 , later AGS-15
 
 , later AGS-16
 
 
 
 
 
 
 
 
 
 
 , later ARC-3
 
 , later ARC-4
 
 
 
 
 , later LKA-54
 
 , later LKA-56
 , later LKA-57
 , later AE-31
 
 
 , later LKA-61
 
 
 
 
 
 
 
 
 
 
 
 
 
 
 
 
 
 
 
 
 
 
 
 
 
 
 
 
 
 
 
 , later LKA-93
 , later LKA-94
 
 
 , later LKA-97
 
 
 
 
 
 , later LKA-103
 , later LKA-104
 , later LKA-105
 , later LKA-106
 , later LKA-107
 , later LKA-108
 , canceled 27 August 1945
 , canceled 27 August 1945
 , canceled 27 August 1945

The Tulare and the Charleston class would be the only AKA/LKAs capable of 20 knots. 

 , later LKA-112
 , later LKA-113
 , later LKA-114
 , later LKA-115
 , later LKA-116
 , later LKA-117

Amphibious Transport (LPA)

All Attack Transports (APA) in service in 1969 were reclassed as Amphibious Transports (LPA).

 
 
 
 
 
 
 
 
 
 
 
 
 
 
 
 
 
 
 
 
 
 
 
 
 
 
 
 
 
 
 
 
 
 
 
 
 
 
 

The Paul Revere class would be the first and only class of APA/LPA capable of 20 knots.

Attack Transport (APA)

All attack transports (APA) in service in 1969 were reclassified as amphibious transports (LPA).

Doyen-class

 , ex-AP-2
 , ex-AP-18

Harris-class

 , ex-AP-8
 , ex-AP-9
 , ex-AP-25
 , ex-AP-26
 , ex-AP-27
 , ex-AP-30. later AG-90
 , ex-AP-34
 , ex-AP-35

McCawley-class

 , ex-AP-10
 , ex-AP-11

Heywood-class 

 , ex-AP-12
 , ex-AP-14
 , ex-AP-15
 , ex-AP-16

Harry Lee-class
 , ex-AP-17

President Jackson-class

 , ex-AP-37
 , ex-AP-38
 , ex-AP-39
 , ex-AP-59
 , ex-AP-60

Crescent City-class

 , ex-AP-40
 
 , ex-AP-64
 , ex-AP-65

Joseph Hewes-class
 USS Joseph Hewes (APA-22), ex-AP-50, torpedoed 11 November 1942 off Morocco, approximately 100 killed

John Penn-class
 , ex-AP-51

Edward Rutledge-class
USS Edward Rutledge (APA-24), ex-AP-52, torpedoed 12 November 1942 off Morocco, 15 killed

Arthur Middleton-class

 , ex-AP-55
 , ex-AP-56
 , ex-AP-57

Bayfield-class

 , ex-AP-78
 , ex-AP-79
 , ex-AP-80
 , ex-AP-81
 , ex-AP-82
 , ex-AP-83, later LPA-38
 , ex-AP-84
 , ex-AP-85
 , ex-AP-86
 , ex-AP-87
 , ex-AP-88
 , ex-AP-89, later LPA-44
 , ex-AP-90, later LPA-45
 , ex-AP-91
 , ex-AP-92
 , ex-AP-93

Ormsby-class

 , ex-AP-94
 , ex-AP-95
 , ex-AP-96

Sumter-class

 , ex-AP-97
 , ex-AP-98
 , ex-AP-99

Windsor-class

 , ex-AP-100

Gilliam-class

Frederick Funston-class

 , ex-AP-48, later T-AP-178
 , ex-AP-49, later T-AP-179

Haskell-class

 
 
 
 
 
 
 
 
 
 
 
 
 
 
 
 , later LPA-132
 
 
 
 
 
 
 
 
 
 
 
 , later LPA-144
 
 , later LPA-146
 , later LPA-147
 
 
 
 
 
 
 , later LPA-154
 
 
 , later LPA-157
 
 
 
 
 
 
 
 
 
 
 
 , later LPA-169
 
 
 
 , later LPA-173
 
 
 
 , later LPA-177
 , later LPA-178
 , later LPA-179
 
 APA-181 to APA-186, all unnamed, canceled, 1944
 
 , later LPA-188
 
 
 
 , later LPA-192
 
 , later LPA-194
 
 , later LPA-196
 
 
 , later LPA-199
 
 
 
 
 , later LPA-204
 
 
 
 , later LPA-208
 
 , later LPA-210
 
 , later LPA-212
 , later LPA-213
 
 , later LPA-215
 
 
 
 
 , later LPA-220
 
 , later LPA-222
 , later LPA-223
 
 , later LPA-225
 
 , later LPA-227
 , later LPA-228
 , later LPA-229
 
 , later LPA-231
 
 , later LPA-233
 , later LPA-234
 , later LPA-235
 , later LPA-236
 , later LPA-237
 
 , later LPA-239
 USS Harnett (APA-240) *
 USS Hempstead (APA-241) *
 USS Iredell (APA-242) *
 USS Luzerne (APA-243) *
 USS Medera (APA-244) *
 USS Maricopa (APA-245) *
 USS McLennan (APA-246) *
 USS Mecklenburg (APA-247) *
(* cancelled in 1945)

Paul Revere-class

The Paul Revere class would be the first and only class of APA/LPA capable of 20 knots.
 , later LPA-248
 , later LPA-249

Amphibious Transport, Small (LPR)

Fast Amphibious Transports with hull symbol LPR were converted destroyer escorts which had originally received the hull classification symbol APD; as of 1969 the remaining ships were reclassified as LPRs.

Charles Lawrence-class

Crosley-class

High-speed Transport (APD)

High-speed Transports (APD) were converted destroyers  and destroyer escorts; they received the US hull classification symbol APD: "AP" for transport and "D" for destroyer. In 1969, the remaining ships were reclassified as "Fast Amphibious Transports" with hull symbol LPR. This classification is not to be confused with hull code "HST", also for "High Speed Transport", currently assigned only to experimental high-speed catamaran designs, and high-speed catamarans chartered from private ferry companies.

 
 
 
 
 
 
 
 
 
 
 
 
 
 
 
 
 
 
 
 
 
 
 
 
 
  — conversion canceled
 
  — conversion canceled
 
 
 
 
 
 
 , ex-DD-266, ex-AVD-13, wrecked by Typhoon Louise Okinawa October 1945

Transport Submarine (LPSS)

 , ex-APSS-282
 , ex-APSS-313, later IXSS-313
 , ex-APSS-315
 , ex-APSS-574

Transport Submarine (APS, ASSP, APSS)

 USS Argonaut (APS-1), ex-SM-1, sunk by Japanese destroyers off Rabaul on 10 January 1943, 102 killed
 USS Tunny (APSS-282), ex-SS-282, SSG-282, later LPSS-282
 USS Perch (APSS-313), ex-SS-313, SSP-313, ASSP-313, later LPSS-313
 USS Sealion (APSS-315), ex-SS-315, SSP-315, ASSP-315, later LPSS-315
 USS Grayback (APSS-574), ex-SS-574, SSG-574, later LPSS-574

Inshore Fire Support Ship (LFR)

 , ex-IFS-1

Landing Craft Air Cushion (LCAC)

Landing Craft, Control (LCC)
Not to be confused with the later Amphibious Command Ship (LCC).

During World War II a number of small boats were built to direct the movements of landing craft as they approached beaches. These were 56 feet in length, displaced 30 tons, and ran 13-16 knots in speed. They were equipped with multiple radios and SO radar (the same radar as on PT boats). During the invasion of southern France they were used to control drone minesweepers.

Landing Craft Infantry (LCI)
The United States Navy built 932 Landing Craft Infantry ships in World War II.

Landing Craft Mechanized (LCM)
The United States Navy built 11,144 landing craft Motorized, designated Landing Craft Mechanized (LCM) in World War II.

Landing Craft Support (Large) (Mark 3), a.k.a. LCS(L)(3)

 USS LCS(L)(3)-1
 USS LCS(L)(3)-2
 USS LCS(L)(3)-3
 USS LCS(L)(3)-4
 USS LCS(L)(3)-5
 USS LCS(L)(3)-6
 USS LCS(L)(3)-7
 USS LCS(L)(3)-8
 USS LCS(L)(3)-9
 USS LCS(L)(3)-10
 USS LCS(L)(3)-11
 USS LCS(L)(3)-12
 USS LCS(L)(3)-13
 USS LCS(L)(3)-14
 USS LCS(L)(3)-15
 USS LCS(L)(3)-16
 USS LCS(L)(3)-17
 USS LCS(L)(3)-18
 USS LCS(L)(3)-19
 USS LCS(L)(3)-20
 USS LCS(L)(3)-21
 USS LCS(L)(3)-22
 USS LCS(L)(3)-23
 USS LCS(L)(3)-24
 USS LCS(L)(3)-25
 USS LCS(L)(3)-26
 USS LCS(L)(3)-27
 USS LCS(L)(3)-28
 USS LCS(L)(3)-29
 USS LCS(L)(3)-30
 USS LCS(L)(3)-31
 USS LCS(L)(3)-32
 USS LCS(L)(3)-33
 USS LCS(L)(3)-34
 USS LCS(L)(3)-35
 USS LCS(L)(3)-36
 USS LCS(L)(3)-37
 USS LCS(L)(3)-38
 USS LCS(L)(3)-39
 USS LCS(L)(3)-40
 USS LCS(L)(3)-41
 USS LCS(L)(3)-42
 USS LCS(L)(3)-43
 USS LCS(L)(3)-44
 USS LCS(L)(3)-45
 USS LCS(L)(3)-46
 USS LCS(L)(3)-47
 USS LCS(L)(3)-48
 USS LCS(L)(3)-49
 USS LCS(L)(3)-50
 USS LCS(L)(3)-51
 USS LCS(L)(3)-52
 USS LCS(L)(3)-53
 USS LCS(L)(3)-54
 USS LCS(L)(3)-55
 USS LCS(L)(3)-56
 USS LCS(L)(3)-57
 USS LCS(L)(3)-58
 USS LCS(L)(3)-59
 USS LCS(L)(3)-60
 USS LCS(L)(3)-61
 USS LCS(L)(3)-62
 USS LCS(L)(3)-63
 USS LCS(L)(3)-64
 USS LCS(L)(3)-65
 USS LCS(L)(3)-66
 USS LCS(L)(3)-67
 USS LCS(L)(3)-68
 USS LCS(L)(3)-69
 USS LCS(L)(3)-70
 USS LCS(L)(3)-71
 USS LCS(L)(3)-72
 USS LCS(L)(3)-73
 USS LCS(L)(3)-74
 USS LCS(L)(3)-75
 USS LCS(L)(3)-76
 USS LCS(L)(3)-77
 USS LCS(L)(3)-78
 USS LCS(L)(3)-79
 USS LCS(L)(3)-80
 USS LCS(L)(3)-81
 USS LCS(L)(3)-82
 USS LCS(L)(3)-83
 USS LCS(L)(3)-84
 USS LCS(L)(3)-85
 USS LCS(L)(3)-86
 USS LCS(L)(3)-87
 USS LCS(L)(3)-88
 USS LCS(L)(3)-89
 USS LCS(L)(3)-90
 USS LCS(L)(3)-91
 USS LCS(L)(3)-92
 USS LCS(L)(3)-93
 USS LCS(L)(3)-94
 USS LCS(L)(3)-95
 USS LCS(L)(3)-96
 USS LCS(L)(3)-97
 USS LCS(L)(3)-98
 USS LCS(L)(3)-99
 USS LCS(L)(3)-100
 USS LCS(L)(3)-101
 USS LCS(L)(3)-102, museum ship
 USS LCS(L)(3)-103
 USS LCS(L)(3)-104
 USS LCS(L)(3)-105
 USS LCS(L)(3)-106
 USS LCS(L)(3)-107
 USS LCS(L)(3)-108
 USS LCS(L)(3)-109
 USS LCS(L)(3)-111
 USS LCS(L)(3)-112
 USS LCS(L)(3)-113
 USS LCS(L)(3)-114
 USS LCS(L)(3)-115
 USS LCS(L)(3)-116
 USS LCS(L)(3)-117
 USS LCS(L)(3)-118
 USS LCS(L)(3)-119
 USS LCS(L)(3)-120
 USS LCS(L)(3)-121
 USS LCS(L)(3)-122
 USS LCS(L)(3)-123
 USS LCS(L)(3)-124
 USS LCS(L)(3)-125
 USS LCS(L)(3)-126
 USS LCS(L)(3)-127
 USS LCS(L)(3)-128
 USS LCS(L)(3)-129
 USS LCS(L)(3)-130

Landing Craft Tank (LCT)
The United States Navy built 1,394 landing craft tank, designated Landing Craft Tank (LCT) in World War II. Those that were still in use in 1949 were redesignated as Landing Craft, Utility.

Landing Craft Utility (LCU)
The United States Navy built the LCU 1466, 1610 and 1627 classes after World War II.

Landing Ship Medium (LSM)
Towards the end of World War II the United States Navy built 558 Landing Ship Medium (LSM) type vessels across three classes.

As of February 2023 the US Marine Corps has proposed the purchase of 18 to 35 modern LSMs; this LSM concept was previously known as the Light Amphibious Warship (LAW).

Landing Ship, Tank (LST)

The United States Navy built nearly 1,200 tank landing ships, classified as "Landing Ship, Tank" or "LST", from the World War II-era up through the early 1970s. The Newport class, which entered service in 1969, would be the last class built and the only class capable of exceeding 20 knots. The 1987 introduction of Landing Craft Air Cushion (LCAC) — which allowed for over-the-horizon amphibious landings onto a far larger number of beaches — made LSTs obsolete, but they remained with the fleet for another decade because they were the only means by which the hundreds of thousands of gallons of motor vehicle fuel needed by a Marine Expeditionary Force could be landed. Only the development of tankers with the Offshore Petroleum Discharge System (OPDS) and the later development of special fuel bladders which gave the LCACs a tanker capability allowed for their retirement.

Landing Ship, Tank, Hospital (LSTH)

Atlantic Tank Landing Ship (ATL)
The ATL hull classification was short-lived; it was changed to Landing Ship Tank (LST).
 USS ATL-1, later USS LST-1

Vehicle Landing Ship (LSV)

The World War II LSVs were converted from cruiser minelayers (CM) and netlayers (AN). After the war most were slated to become mine countermeasures ships (MCS), but only two were actually converted.

 , former CM-6, AP-106, later MCS-1
 , former CM-7, AP-107, later MCS-2
 , former AN-3, AP-108, later MCS-3 canceled
 , former AN-4, AP-109, later MCS-4 canceled
 , former AN-1, AP-160, later MCS-5 canceled
 , former AN-2, AP-161, later AKN-6

The post-WW2 LSVs were among the first roll-on/roll-off cargo ships.

 , former T-AK-269, later T-AKR-7
 , former LSD-23, T-AK-273
 , later T-AKR-9

Patrol Craft, Control (PCC)

Thirty-five s were converted into amphibious landing control vessel during World War II and reclassified as Patrol Craft, Control after the war. Extra personnel (eight radiomen, two signalmen, one quartermaster and two communications officers), accommodations and improved radar and communications equipment were added. PCs proved exceptionally adept as Control Vessels, guiding waves of landing craft during numerous amphibious landings in the European and Pacific Theaters.

 PCC-549, ex-PC-549
 PCC-555, ex-PC-555
 PCC-563, ex-PC-563
 PCC-578, ex-PC-578
 USS Lenoir (PCC-582), ex-PC-582
 USS Houghton (PCC-588), ex-PC-588
 USS Metropolis (PCC-589), ex-PC-589
 PCC-598, ex-PC-598
 PCC-802, ex-PC-802, later to Republic of Korea as Sam Gak San (PC-703)
 PCC-803, ex-PC-803
 PCC-1136, ex-PC-1136
 PCC-1137, ex-PC-1137
 USS Escandido (PCC-1169), ex-PC-1169
 USS Guymon (PCC-1177), ex-PC-1177
 USS Kewaunee (PCC-1178), ex-PC-1178
 USS Martinez (PCC-1244), ex-PC-1244
 USS Ukiah (PCC-1251), ex-PC-1251

Patrol Craft Sweeper, Control (PCSC)
Thirteen Patrol Craft Sweepers (which were built on 134-foot  hulls) were converted into amphibious landing control vessel during World War II and reclassified as Patrol Craft Sweeper, Control.

 , ex-PCS-1379
 , ex-PCS-1389
 , ex-PCS-1390
 , ex-PCS-1391
 , ex-PCS-1402
 , ex-PCS-1403
 , ex-PCS-1418
 , ex-PCS-1421
 , ex-PCS-1429
 , ex-PCS-1452
 , ex-PCS-1455
 , ex-PCS-1460
 , ex-PCS-1461

Expeditionary Fast Transport (EPF)

Spearhead-class

 [A]
 [A]
 [A]
 [A]
 [A]
 [A]
 [A]
 [A]
 [A]
 [A]
 [A]
 [A]
 [A]
 [P]
 [P]
(T-EPF-16) [P]

In January 2023, the Navy announced that three Expeditionary Medical Ships (EMS) had been approved in the 2023 military budget.

(T-EPF-17) [P]
(T-EPF-18) [P]
(T-EPF-19) [P]

Expeditionary Mobile Base (ESB)

Lewis B. Puller-class

Note there is no ESB-1 or ESB-2, the ESB and ESD hulls have one sequence.
  [A]
  [A]
  [A]
  [P]
  [P]

Expeditionary Transfer Dock (ESD)

Montford Point-class

  [A]
  [A]

Littoral Combat Ship (LCS)

Freedom-class

  [I]
  [A]
  [A]
  [A]
  [A]
  [A]
  [A]
  [A]
  [A]
  [A]
  [A]
  [P]
  [P]
  [P]
  [P]
  [P]

Independence-class
  

  [I]
  [I]
  [A]
  [A]
  [A]
  [A]
  [A]
  [A]
  [A]
  [A]
  [A]
  [A]
  [A]
  [A]
  [P]
  [P]
  [P]
  [P]
  [P]

Barracks Ships
Barracks ships are auxiliaries that are used in a variety of roles, not only for amphibious warfare.

Self-Propelled Barracks Ship (APB)

Non Self-Propelled Barracks Ship (APL)

Offshore Petroleum Distribution System (OPDS) ships

OPDS ships support amphibious operations by pumping needed fuel ashore without the need for port facilities. They do not have unique hull classification symbols.

Pump vessels
 USNS Vice Adm. K. R. Wheeler (T-AG-5001) [A]

Tankers
  [I]

See also
 Amphibious assault ship
 Amphibious warfare ship
 List of current ships of the United States Navy
 
 Mobile offshore base

References

Citations

Sources

External links 
Museum ships
 USS LCI(L)-713 - Amphibious Forces Memorial Museum, Portland, OR
 USS LCI(L)-1091 - Humboldt Bay Naval Sea/Air Museum, Eureka, CA
 USS LCS(L)(3)-102 - Landing Craft Support Museum, Mare Island, CA
 USS LST-325 - The USS LST Ship Memorial, Evansville, IN
 USS LST-393 - USS LST 393 Veterans Museum, Muskegon, MI
 USS Stark County (LST-1134) - Surat Thani, Thailand

Amphibious warfare vessels of the United States Navy
Lists of ships of the United States
United States amphibious warfare ships